The 2013 ITF Women's Circuit is the 2013 edition of the second tier tour for women's professional tennis. It is organised by the International Tennis Federation and is a tier below the WTA Tour. The ITF Women's Circuit includes tournaments with prize money ranging from $10,000 up to $100,000.

Key

Month

January

February

March

See also
 2013 WTA Tour
 2013 WTA 125K series
 2013 ATP World Tour
 2013 ATP Challenger Tour
 2013 ITF Women's Circuit
 2013 ITF Men's Circuit
 Women's Tennis Association
 International Tennis Federation

External links
 International Tennis Federation (ITF)

 1